Simone Bianchetti was an Italian professional sailor born on February 20, 1968, in Cervia (in the province of Ravenna in Italy) and died on June 28, 2003, in Savona in Italy.

Biography
The son of Pilade and Maria, he graduated from the Cesenatico Naval Institute and then obtained the title of long-term captain at the "Giorgio Cini" naval college in Venice. He served in the Italian Navy for two years, then devoted himself to sailing.

In 1994 he took part in his first major solo regatta, the BOC Challenge on Town of Cervia in Class 2 (40 to 50 foot monohulls). He retired on the second stage in the Indian Ocean.

In 2001 he bought Aquitaine Innovations for the next Vendée Globe. He finished fourth in the IMOCA class under the name Tiscali. Finally, he sold it to Patrick de Radiguès. He then turned to the Boat of Catherine Chabaud, the former The Penguin, which he renamed Tiscali because he kept the same sponsor. He participated in Around Alone, which he finished in third place. Coincidentally, Patrick de Radiguès competed in the same competition on Simone's old boat, but had less luck and had to give up.

On 28 June 2003 he died of a ruptured aneurysm while on his boat Tiscali in the port of Savona.

Sailing Career highlights

Publications

References

1968 births
2003 deaths
Italian male sailors (sport)
Sportspeople from Ravenna
IMOCA 60 class sailors
Italian Vendee Globe sailors
2000 Vendee Globe sailors
Vendée Globe finishers
Single-handed circumnavigating sailors